Coleophora salviella is a moth of the family Coleophoridae. It is found on the Canary Islands (Tenerife, La Gomera, Fuerteventura) and in Algeria, Turkmenistan, Afghanistan and Pakistan.

The larvae feed on Salvia aegyptiaca. They create an almost straight composite leaf case, composed of two or three leaf fragments. Full-grown larvae can be found from April to June.

References

salviella
Moths of Africa
Moths of Asia
Moths described in 1916